Burdine Hall is a building on the University of Texas at Austin campus, in the U.S. state of Texas. The classroom and office building is named after J. Alton Burdine, a former dean of the University of Texas College of Arts and Sciences, and has previously been referred to as the North Campus Classroom-Office. The hall reportedly cost $2.1 million and has previously housed the departments of anthropology, government, and sociology, as well as student financial aid offices. There is a local urban legend that the layout of the building's windows was intended to resemble a computer punched card. Departments and Centers currently housed
Department of Germanic Studies
Department of Slavic and Eurasian Studies
Center for Russian, East European, and Eurasian Studies
Department of American Studies
Center of Women's and Gender Studies
Center of Asian American Studies
Department of Religious Studies
Texas Language Center

References

External links

 

1970 establishments in Texas
University and college buildings completed in 1970
University of Texas at Austin campus